At least 3,042 species of Hymenoptera are known to occur in Ireland. The true number of species occurring in Ireland is thought  to be significantly greater than this figure.

Suborder Symphyta (sawflies)

Superfamily Xyeloidea

Xyelidae  1 species
Xyela julii

Superfamily Pamphilioidea

Pamphilidae (leaf-rolling / web-spinning sawflies) 8 species
including
Pamphilius hortorum 
Pamphilius betulae 
Pamphilius sylvaticus

Superfamily Siricoidea

Siricidae (horntail, wood wasp)  5 species including
Urocerus gigas
Sirex cyaneus 
Sirex juvencus 
Sirex noctilio
Xeris spectrum

Superfamily Cephoidea (stem sawflies)

Cephidae  1 species
Calameuta pallipes

Superfamily Tenthredinoidea

Argidae (some sawflies) 7 species including
Arge cyanocrocea
Arge ustulata
Sterictiphora geminata 
Cimbicidae (large-bodied, often hairy sawflies) 10 species including
Abia sericea
Cimbex femoratus
Trichiosoma lucorum 
Trichiosoma vitellina 
Diprionidae (conifer sawflies) 3 species including
Neodiprion sertifer
Diprion pini
Tenthredinidae (many sawflies) 239 species including 
Aglaostigma aucupariae 
Aglaostigma fulvipes
Allantus cinctus
Amauronematus lateralis
Aneugmenus padi
Apethymus serotinus
Athalia circularis 
Athalia cordata
Athalia lugens
Athalia rosae
Athalia scutellariae
Calameuta pallipes 
Caliroa cerasi
Cladius pectinicornis 
Dolerus aeneus
Dolerus aericeps 
Dolerus bajulus 
Dolerus germanicus 
Dolerus madidus 
Dolerus nitens  
Dolerus picipes
Dolerus varispinus 
Dolerus vestigialis
Empria liturata 
Endelomyia aethiops
Euura pavida 
Eutomostethus ephippium 
Eriocampa ovata
Fenella nigrita
Fenusa dohrnii 
Fenusa pumila 
Fenusella hortulana 
Fenusella nana 
Halidamia affinis 
Hemichroa australis 
Hemichroa crocea 
Heterarthrus microcephalus 
Heterarthrus nemoratus 
Heterarthrus vagans 
Hoplocampa pectoralis
Macrophya duodecimpunctata 
Macrophya punctumalbum
Mesoneura opaca 
Metallus pumilus 
Monophadnoides rubi
Monostegia abdominalis
Monsoma pulveratum
Nematus lucidus
Nematus myosotidis 
Nematus ribesii
Nematus spiraeae
Nematinus acuminatus
Nesoselandria morio
Pachynematus clitellatus 
Pachyprotasis antennata 
Pachyprotasis rapae
Periclista albida
Perineura rubi 
Pristiphora geniculata
Pristiphora cincta 
Pristiphora laricis  
Pristiphora mollis 
Pristiphora staudingeri 
Profenusa pygmaea
Pseudodineura fuscula 
Rhogogaster viridis
Selandria serva 
Strombocerus delicatulus
Strongylogaster multifasciata 
Tenthredo arcuata
Tenthredo atra
Tenthredo balteata 
Tenthredo brevicornis
Tenthredo ferruginea 
Tenthredo livida
Tenthredo colon
Tenthredo mesomela
Tenthredo mioceras 
Tenthredo moniliata
Tenthredo notha
Tenthredo obsoleta 
Tenthredo temula
Tenthredopsis nassata 
Tenthredopsis scutellaris

Suborder Apocrita (wasps, bees, ants)
See List of Hymenoptera (Apocrita) of Ireland

Superfamily Chrysidoidea (parasitoid and cleptoparasitic wasps)

Dryinidae  18 species
Bethylidae (aculeate wasps) 3 species   
Chrysididae (cuckoo/emerald wasp)  6 species

Superfamily Vespoidea

Tiphiidae (flower wasps) 1 species   
Mutillidae (velvet ants) 1 species  
Formicidae (ants) 20 + species 
Pompilidae (spider wasps) 13 species   
Vespidae (many eusocial and solitary wasps) 14 species

Superfamily Apoidea (sphecoid wasps and bees)

Sphecidae (many parasitoidal wasps) 2 species 
Crabronidae  39 species   
Apidae (bees) 100 species
Andrenidae (mining bees)

Suborder Parasitica (parasitoid wasp)

Superfamily Chalcidoidea (chalcid wasps)
Aphelinidae (tiny parasitic wasps) 11 species
Chalcididae (parasitoid and hyperparasitoid wasps) 1 species  
Encyrtidae (parasitic wasps) 59 species   
Eulophidae  140 species
Eupelmidae (parasitic wasps) 3 species including,
Eupelmus vesicularis 1 species 
Eurytomidae  17 species   
Mymaridae (fairyflies / fairy wasps) 21 species 
Ormyridae (parasitic wasps) 1 species 
Pteromalidae (parasitoid wasps) 167 species 
Tetracampidae (parasitic wasps) 2 species  
Torymidae  32 species   
Trichogrammatidae (tiny wasps) 3 species

Superfamily Ichneumonoidea

Ichneumonidae (ichneumon wasps) 1,135 species including
Ichneumon sarcitorius
Ichneumon insidiosus
Ichneumon extensorius
Rhyssa persuasoria
Anomalon cruentatum
Alomya debellator
Pimpla rufipes
Pimpla turionellae
Pimpla ovivora
Agrothereutes abbreviatus
Cratichneumon coruscator
Amblyjoppa fuscipennis
Vulgichneumon saturatorius
Diplazon laetatorius
Euceros albitarsus 
Astiphromma sericans
Ophion luteus
Xorides fuligator
Braconidae (parasitoid wasps) 529 species including
Chorebus lateralis
Cotesia glomerata
Allurus lituratus
Agathis breviseta
Atormus victus
Blacus humilis
Centistes ater
Chorebus lateralis
Coelinidea elegans
Dolopsidea indagator
Hygroplitis rugulosus
Laotris striatula
Microplitis spectabilis
Opius pygmaeator
Phaedrotoma aethiops
Praon abjectum
Synelix semirugosa
Trachionus hians
Zele caligatus

Superfamily Evanioidea
Gasteruptiidae 1 species
Gasteruption jaculator

Superfamily Platygastroidea

Platygastridae (parasitoid wasps) 65 species 
Scelionidae (parasitoid wasps) 28 species

Superfamily Proctotrupoidea

Diapriidae (tiny wasps) 185 species including
Ismarus dorsiger    
Heloridae  2 species  
Proctotrupidae  36 species

Superfamily Ceraphronoidea

Ceraphronidae   6 species 
Megaspilidae  13 species

Superfamily Cynipoidea

Figitidae (parasitoid wasps) 56 species  
Cynipidae (gall wasps / gallflies) 39 species
including
Andricus kollari
Andricus foecundatrix
Andricus lignicola
Biorhiza pallida
Neuroterus albipes
Neuroterus anthracinus
Neuroterus numismalis
Neuroterus quercusbaccarum
Ibaliidae  1 species

References

Gavin R. Broad Checklist of British and Irish Hymenoptera Introduction  Biodiversity Data Journal 2: e1113 (17 Jun 2014)
 Gavin R. Broad, Mark R. Shaw and H. Charles J. Godfray Checklist of British and Irish Hymenoptera - Braconidae Biodiversity Data Journal 2016; (4): e8151.Published online 2016 Apr 21. doi:  10.3897/BDJ.4.e8151
Gavin R. Broad and Laurence Livermore Checklist of British and Irish Hymenoptera - Evanioidea  Biodivers Data J. 2014; (2): e1116.Published online 2014 Jun 17. doi:  10.3897/BDJ.2.e1116
 Gavin R. Broad  Checklist of British and Irish Hymenoptera - Ichneumonidae Biodivers Data J. 2016; (4): e9042.Published online 2016 Jul 5. doi:  10.3897/BDJ.4.e9042
Peter N. Buhl, Gavin R. Broad and David G. Notton Checklist of British and Irish Hymenoptera - Platygastroidea Biodivers Data J. 2016; (4): e7991.Published online 2016 Apr 22. doi:  10.3897/BDJ.4.e7991
Dale-Skey N, Askew R R, Noyes J S, Livermore and Broad GR Checklist of British and Irish Hymenoptera - Chalcidoidea and Mymarommatoidea.Biodivers Data J. 2016 Jun 6;(4):e8013. doi: 10.3897/BDJ.4.e8013. eCollection 2016.
Gavin R. Broad Checklist of British and Irish Hymenoptera - Proctotrupoidea Biodivers Data J. 2016; (4): e7936.Published online 2016 Apr 15. doi:  10.3897/BDJ.4.e7936
Andrew D. Liston, Guy T. Knight, David A. Sheppard,  Gavin R. and Laurence Livermore Checklist of British and Irish Hymenoptera - Sawflies, ‘Symphyta’  Biodivers Data J. 2014; (2): e1168.Published online 2014 Aug 29. doi:  10.3897/BDJ.2.e1168
Gavin R Broad Checklist of British and Irish Hymenoptera - Trigonaloidea Biodivers Data J. 2016; (4): e7935.Published online 2016 Apr 15. doi:  10.3897/BDJ.4.e7935
George R. Else, Barry Bolton, and Gavin R. Broad Checklist of British and Irish Hymenoptera - aculeates (Apoidea, Chrysidoidea and Vespoidea) Biodivers Data J.  2016; (4): e8050. Published online 2016 Apr 7. doi:  10.3897/BDJ.4.e8050
 Gavin R. Broad and Laurence Livermore Checklist of British and Irish Hymenoptera - Ceraphronoidea Biodivers Data J. 2014; (2): e1167. Published online 2014 Aug 27. doi:  10.3897/BDJ.2.e1167

Further reading
Edward Saunders, 1896 The Hymenoptera Aculeata of the British Islands : a descriptive account of the families, genera, and species indigenous to Great Britain and Ireland, with notes as to habits, localities, habitats London :L. Reeve & Co. online includes coloured plates. Very useful descriptions out of date nomenclature but see plates on commons and BWARS lists (links)

External links
West Palearctic distribution Fauna Europaea
Universal Chalcidoid Database
Bees, Wasps and Ants - the British and Irish Aculeate Hymenoptera
Bees of Ireland
Faune de France Insectes Hyménoptères pdfs free downloads
Royal Entomological Society Handbooks Out of print parts available as free pdfs  are:
Vol 6 Part 1. Hymenoptera - Introduction and key to families (2nd edition). Owain Westmacott Richards
Vol 6 Part 2a. Hymenoptera - Symphyta. R. B. Benson
Vol 6 Part 2b. Hymenoptera - Symphyta. R. B. Benson
Vol 6 Part 2c. Hymenoptera - Symphyta. R. B. Benson
Vol 6 Part 3a. Hymenoptera - Bethyloidea (excluding Chrysididae). J. F. Perkins
Vol 6 Part 3b. Hymenoptera - Aculeata (Scolioidea, Vespoidea and Sphecoidea). O.W.Richards
Vol 6 Part 3c. Hymenoptera - Formicidae. Barry Bolton & Cedric A. Collingwood
Vol 6 Part 4. Hymenoptera - Pompilidae. Michael C. Day
Vol 6 Part 5. Cuckoo-Wasps. Hymenoptera, Chrysididae. D. Morgan
Vol 7 Part 1. Hymenoptera - Ichneumonoidea (Pimplinae). M. G. Fitton, M. R. Shaw and I. D. Gauld
Vol 7 Part 2a i. Hymenoptera - Ichneumonoidea. J. F. Perkins
Vol 7 Part 2a ii. Hymenoptera - Ichneumonoidea. J. F. Perkins
Vol 7 Part 2b. Ichneumonidae - Orthopelmatinae & Anomaloninae. I. D. Gauld & P. A. Mitchell
Vol 7 Part 11. Classification & biology of braconid wasps (Hymenoptera: Braconidae). M.R. Shaw & T. Huddleston
Vol 8 Part 1a. Hymenoptera. Cynipoidea. Key to families and subfamilies and Cynipinae (including galls). R. D. Eady and J. Quinlan
Vol 8 Part 1b. Hymenoptera. Cynipoidea. Eucoilidae. John Quinlan
Vol 8 Part 2a. Hymenoptera 2. Chalcidoidea Section (a). Ch. Ferrière and G. J. Kerrich
Vol 8 Part 2b. Hymenoptera 2. Chalcidoidea Section (b). R. R. Askew
Vol 8 Part 3d i. Hymenoptera, Proctotrupoidea. Diapriidae subfamily Diapriinae. G. E. J. Nixon
Vol 8 Part 3d ii. Hymenoptera. Proctotrupoidea. Diapriidae subfamily Belytinae. G. E. J. Nixon
 Antwiki
 

Ireland, hymenoptera
Ireland
hymen